"What Have They Done to My Song Ma" is a song written and performed by Melanie Safka. It was co-written by HM Saffer II, a notable American painter and musician who worked for Warner Brothers Productions. 

It was released in 1970 as the B-side of Melanie's "Ruby Tuesday" single and included on the album Candles in the Rain. The single reached the number 39 in the United Kingdom and peaked within the top 20 in Norway and the Wallonia region of Belgium.

Other artists have recorded it as "Look What They've Done to My Song Ma", after the song's first line, and this title is used on the music page at Melanie's website.

Cover versions

Daliah Lavi recorded a successful German version of the song in 1971 and Ray Charles released a cover (as "Look What They've Done to My Song, Ma") in 1972. It has also been tackled by many other artists, including Nina Simone, the New Seekers, and Billie Jo Spears. The New Seekers' version topped the New Zealand Singles Chart and reached the top 10 in Australia, Canada, and on the US Billboard Easy Listening chart.

Dalida recorded the song in French and Italian and released both as singles. Czechoslovak singer Helena Vondráčková did a rendition in 1971 as "Kam zmizel ten starý song" with Czech lyrics by Zdeněk Borovec. Jeanette did an English/French version in 1973. Yugoslav rock band Bajaga i Instruktori released a cover of it with lyrics in Serbian, called "Vidi šta sam ti uradio od pesme, mama", in 1985.

It was used in the 1970s as a commercial for Lifebuoy soap ("Look what they've done to my Lifebuoy"), and in the 1980s as a commercial jingle for Ramada Inn (as "Look what they've done to Ramada") and for Oatmeal Crisp cereal (as "Look what they've done to my oatmeal"). In October 2012, Miley Cyrus released a video of her own acoustic version of the song as part of her Backyard Sessions series. In 2015, Melanie joined her to duet on the song in addition to "Peace Will Come (According to Plan)". Another take on the song was done by Jack Wild that appeared on his album Everything's Coming Up Roses, released in 1971.

Charts

Melanie version

Dalida version

New Seekers version

Weekly charts

Year-end charts

References

1970 songs
1970 singles
Buddah Records singles
Dalida songs
Melanie (singer) songs
The New Seekers songs
Number-one singles in New Zealand